Greg Garrett may refer to:

 Greg Garrett (baseball) (1947–2003), American baseball pitcher
 Greg Garrett (writer) (born 1961), American writer and professor